The Treasurer was a senior post in the pre-Union government of Scotland, the Privy Council of Scotland.

Lord Treasurer
The full title of the post was Lord High Treasurer, Comptroller, Collector-General and Treasurer of the New Augmentation, formed as it was from the amalgamation of four earlier offices. Of these, the Treasurer and Comptroller had originated in 1425 when the Chamberlain's financial functions were transferred to them. From 1466 the Comptroller had sole responsibility for financing the royal household to which certain revenues (the property) were appropriated, with the Treasurer being responsible for the remaining revenue (the casualty) and other expenditure.  The Collector-General, created in 1562, handled the Crown's revenue from the thirds of benefices, and the Treasurer of the New Augmentation was responsible for the former church lands annexed to the Crown in 1587.

From 1581 Queen Elizabeth sent James VI an annual sum of money. In February 1599 the Privy Council declared that the Treasurer would administer this English subsidy, spending it on clothes for the royal family and the household of Prince Henry. In previous years the goldsmith Thomas Foulis and cloth merchant Robert Jousie accounted this money.

All four offices were held by the same person from 1610 onwards, but their separate titles survived the effective merging of their functions in 1635. From 1667 to 1682 the Treasury was in commission, and again from 1686 to 1708, when the separate Scottish Treasury was abolished. From 1690 the Crown nominated one person to sit in Parliament as Treasurer.

The Treasurer-depute was also a senior post in the pre-Union government of Scotland. It was the equivalent of the English post of Chancellor of the Exchequer.

Originally a deputy to the Treasurer, the Treasurer-depute emerged as a separate Crown appointment by 1614. Its holder attended the Privy Council in the absence of the Treasurer, but gained independent membership of the Council in 1587 and sat in the Parliament of Scotland as a Great Officer of State in 1593 and from 1617 onwards.

List of Treasurers 

The following have been identified as Treasurers of Scotland.

Accounts of the Lord High Treasurer

The final audited accounts of the Lord High Treasurer were public records of Scotland. These survive as an almost complete record from 1473 to 1635 at General Register House in Edinburgh. Even the early accounts were written on paper rather than vellum. The Scots language was preferred over Latin for the expenditure or "discharge" side. The income, of rents and feudal duties, especially the fees on property transactions known as "compositions", was written in Latin. The record of expenses varies considerably over the reigns. For example, as Regent, Mary of Guise paid for her stable, costume, and wardrobe separately and these expenses do not occur in her treasurer's accounts.

There are also surviving duplicate volumes for the years 1574 to 1596. These volumes were kept for many years by the family of the Earl of Leven and Melville, and were deposited in the National Archives of Scotland in 1944. Their exact purpose in royal accounting remains unclear. The layout of these duplicate accounts and the wording of the entries is not an exact replica of the main series.

The manuscripts were published between 1877 and 1978 in thirteen volumes covering up to 1580. The editors silently abbreviated and omitted some material, especially details of making costume.

Historians often refer to the published volumes in references as TA:

 Accounts of the Lord High Treasurer of Scotland, 1473–1498, vol. 1, HM General Register House, (Edinburgh, 1877).
 Accounts of the Lord High Treasurer of Scotland, 1506-1507, HM Register House, vol. 3 (Edinburgh, 1901)..
 Accounts of the Lord High Treasurer of Scotland, 1507-1513, HM Register House, vol. 4 (Edinburgh, 1902).
 Accounts of the Lord High Treasurer of Scotland, 1515-1531, HM Register House, vol. 5 (Edinburgh, 1903).
 Accounts of the Lord High Treasurer of Scotland, 1531-1538, HM Register House, vol. 6 (Edinburgh, 1905).
 Accounts of the Lord High Treasurer of Scotland, 1538-1541, HM Register House, vol. 7 (Edinburgh, 1907).
 Accounts of the Lord High Treasurer of Scotland, 1541-1546, HM Register House, vol. 8, (Edinburgh, 1908)
 Accounts of the Treasurer of Scotland, 1566–1574, vol. 12, Scottish Record Office, (1970)
 Accounts of the Treasurer of Scotland, 1574–1580, vol. 13, Scottish Record Office, (1978)

Notes

References

External links
 Guide to the Exchequer records at the National Archives of Scotland
 Maurits den Hollander, 'Comparative cultures of accountability: the Scottish Exchequer and the Audit Chamber of Holland between 1477 and 1515', Comparative Legal History, 6:2 (2018), pp. 158-183.

 
Lists of political office-holders in Scotland
Monarchy and money
Scottish exchequer